Kodachrome was a brand of color transparency film sold by Kodak.

Kodachrome may also refer to:
"Kodachrome", a song by Paul Simon from his 1973 album There Goes Rhymin' Simon
Kodachrome (motion picture film), a 2017 American drama film
Kodachrome Basin State Park in Utah
The color scheme of the Southern Pacific–Santa Fe Railroad

See also

 Kodacolor (disambiguation)